Without Warning were an American progressive metal band from New York City, formed in 1987. The band was noted for their Christian themes and progressive sound.

History

Demo
Without Warning released a 20-minute demo in 1992.

Making Time
In 1993, one year after the release of their demo, they released their debut album. Making Time was released originally by Japanese metal label Zero Corporation. The album was originally recorded and mixed by guitarist Ted Burger and engineer Jeff Reidmiller in one week. The pre-release recordings caught the attention of several influential Japanese critics including Masa Itoh and Koh Sakai leading to the decision to spend additional time and bringing in Eddie Kramer to remix the record. Making Time spawned several hit songs including "Taste of Sin" which reached No. 19 on Japan's Burrn! magazine charts. The song "Making Time" also became the theme song for Koh Sakai's Power Rock Today radio show and remained there for several years. Making Time was listed as the No. 19 album of the year for 1993 on Japan's Burrn! magazine charts.
It was reissued in 2004 under the independent label Heavencross Records in Europe.

Believe
Two years after the release of their debut album, they released their second album Believe. Believe was produced by Alex Perialas. Guitarist Ted Burger was featured in Japan's Young Guitar magazine and was voted the fourth-best guitarist in MVP's readers poll.

Step Beyond
In 1998, they released their third and final album, Step Beyond.

Breakup
Following the release of the album in 1998, in 1999 the band broke up.

Discography

Studio albums
Making Time (1993)
Believe (1995)
Step Beyond (1998)

Demo
Demo (1992)

Band members
Ted Burger − guitar (1991−1999)
Jack Bielata − vocals (1991−1999)
Vinnie Fontanetta − keyboards (1991−1999)
Graham Thomson − bass (1991−1999)
Steve Michael − drums (1991−1999)

References

Heavy metal musical groups from New York (state)
American progressive metal musical groups
Musical groups established in 1987
Musical quintets